Brian Love (born 7 April 1952) is a Canadian rower. He competed in the men's coxless pair event at the 1976 Summer Olympics.

References

1952 births
Living people
Canadian male rowers
Olympic rowers of Canada
Rowers at the 1976 Summer Olympics
Rowers from Toronto
Pan American Games medalists in rowing
Pan American Games silver medalists for Canada
Rowers at the 1975 Pan American Games